Charles Villiers Stanford's Serenade in F major, Op. 95 is a composition for a chamber ensemble of nine soloists, composed in 1905.

Background

Stanford composed the Serenade between June and July 1905, at the same time as he was working on his sixth symphony.

Instrumentation

The composition is scored for flute, clarinet, bassoon, horn, 2 violins, viola, cello, and double bass.

Structure

The composition is in four movements:

Allegro
Allegro molto
Andante
Allegro comodo

Performance history

According to Dibble the first performance of the Serenade took place at the Aeolian Hall, London on 25 January 1906. He also notes a further performance by students at the Royal College of Music in 1913. However, Wilcox, citing Michael Bryant, states that the first public performance was in Sheffield in 1937.

References
Notes

Sources
 

Compositions by Charles Villiers Stanford
Stanford
Compositions for nonet
1905 compositions
Compositions in F major